Bruce Purser Reserve is a sports facility in Kellyville, an outer suburb of Sydney, Australia. It was constructed in 2008 on the site of a former rubbish tip, at the corner of Commercial Road and Withers Road. Its main feature is a grassed oval constructed to competition standards for Australian football and cricket. This is supplemented by practice pitches for cricket, an amenities building with changing rooms and a canteen, plus picnic areas and car parking. The ground is floodlit, enabling the playing of night matches.

The first major event at the Reserve was an Australian Football League pre-season practice match between the Sydney Swans and the Western Bulldogs on 14 March 2009. The ground was officially opened in a ceremony at half-time during that game. The Swans played North Melbourne in a NAB Cup match at Bruce Purser Reserve in 2012.

The ground is the home of East Coast Eagles in the Sydney AFL competition.

External links
Profile on Hills Shire local government website

Sports venues in Sydney
North East Australian Football League grounds